The Ecuadorian Civilian Space Agency (EXA) is a private Ecuadorian organization founded in 2007 that conducts research on space and planetary sciences. It is a non-profit non-governmental organization with civilian oversight.

EXA had tested microgravity via parabolic flight with the Ecuadorian Air Force. EXA launched Ecuador's first satellite, the CubeSat NEE-01 Pegaso, in April 2013 aboard a Chinese Long March 2D. Its second satellite, the follow-on CubeSat NEE-02 Krysaor, was launched from Russia aboard a Dnepr rocket in November 2013.

Notes

References

External links 
  (in English)

Non-profit organisations based in Ecuador
Research institutes in Ecuador
Space organizations